The  is one of Japan's major manga awards, and is sponsored by Shogakukan Publishing. It has been awarded annually for serialized manga and features candidates from a number of publishers. It is the oldest manga award in Japan, being given since 1955.

Categories
The current award categories are:
 
 
 
 

Each winning work will be honored with a bronze statuette, a certificate and a prize of 1 million yen (about US$7,500). Special awards are also occasionally given out for outstanding work, lifetime achievement, and so forth.

Recipients
The laureates were awarded for comics published during the years listed in the table. However, the laureates were not presented and the prizes were not given out until the beginning of the following year. The prizes are often referred to by the numbers listed below instead of the years.

See also
 List of manga awards

References
General

Specific

External links
  
 Archived list of winners 1956–2022

Awards established in 1956
Comics awards
Manga awards
 
1956 establishments in Japan